Heterojunction solar cells (HJT), variously known as Silicon heterojunctions (SHJ) or Heterojunction with Intrinsic Thin Layer (HIT), are a family of photovoltaic cell technologies based on a heterojunction formed between semiconductors with dissimilar band gaps. They are a hybrid technology, combining aspects of conventional crystalline solar cells with thin-film solar cells. As of 2023, Silicon heterojunction architecture has the highest cell efficiency for commercial-sized silicon solar cells. In 2022–2024, SHJ cells are expected to overtake Aluminium Back surface field (Al-BSF) solar cells in market share to become the second-most adopted commercial solar cell technology after PERx/TOPCon, increasing to nearly 20% by 2032.

SHJ cells generally consist of an active crystalline silicon absorber substrate passivated by a thin layer of hydrogenated intrinsic amorphous silicon (denoted as a-Si:H) or nanocrystalline silicon (the "buffer layer") and appropriately doped amorphous selective contacts. The selective contact material and the absorber have different band gaps, forming the heterojunction that is analogous to the p-n junction of traditional solar cells. The high efficiency of heterojunction solar cells is owed mostly to the excellent passivation qualities of the buffer layers,  particularly with respect to separating the highly recombination-active metallic contacts from the absorber. Although intrinsic buffer layers are effectively non-conductive, charge carriers can tunnel through as the thickness is typically less than 10 nm. It is advantageous for the passivating layer to have a higher band gap in order to minimise parasitic absorption of photons, as absorption coefficient is partially dependent on band gap.

Heterojunction cells are commercially mass-produced and are commonly bifacial. As the thin layers are usually temperature sensitive, heterojunction cells are constrained to a low-temperature manufacturing process. This presents challenges for electrode metallisation, as the typical silver paste screen printing method requires firing at up to 800 °C; well above the upper tolerance for most buffer layer materials. As a result, the electrodes are composed of a low-temperature silver paste or electroplated copper.

History 
The heterojunction structure, and the ability of amorphous silicon layers to effectively passivate crystalline silicon has been well documented since the 1970s. Heterojunction solar cells using amorphous and crystalline silicon were developed with a conversion efficiency of more than 12% in 1983. Sanyo Electric Co. (now a subsidiary of Panasonic Group) filed several patents pertaining to heterojunction devices including a-Si and μc-Si intrinsic layers in the early 1990s, trademarked "heterojunction with intrinsic thin-layer" (HIT). The inclusion of the intrinsic layer significantly increased efficiency over doped a-Si heterojunction solar cells through reduced density of trapping states, and reduced dark tunnelling leakage currents.

Research and development of SHJ solar cells was suppressed until the expiry of Sanyo-issued patents in 2011, allowing various companies to develop SHJ technology for commercialisation. In 2014, HIT cells with conversion efficiencies exceeding 25% were developed, which was then the highest for single junction crystalline silicon cells. This record was broken more recently in 2018 by Kaneka corporation, which produced 26.7% efficient large area interdigitated back contact (IBC) SHJ solar cells, and again in 2022 by LONGi with 26.8% efficiency. As of 2023, this is the highest recorded efficiency for monojunction silicon solar cells. Heterojunction modules have been fabricated with efficiency up to 23.89%.

Structure 

A typical heterojunction solar cell is composed of a p–i–n–i–n-doped stack of silicon layers; the middle being an n-type crystalline silicon wafer and the others being amorphous thin layers. Then, overlayers of an antireflection coating and metal are used for light and current collection.

Absorber 
The substrate, in which electron-hole pairs are formed, is usually n-type monocrystalline silicon doped with phosphorus. In industrial production of SHJ solar cells, high quality n-type Czochralski silicon is required because the low-temperature process cannot provide the benefits of gettering and bulk hydrogenation. Photons absorbed outside the substrate do not contribute to photocurrent and constitute losses in quantum efficiency.

Buffer and carrier selection 
Intrinsic amorphous silicon is then deposited onto both sides of the substrate using PECVD from a mixture of silane (SiH4) and hydrogen (H2), forming the heterojunction and passivating the surface. The selective contacts are then similarly formed by deposition of the p- and n-type highly doped amorphous silicon layers. Examples of dopant gases include phosphine (PH3) for n-type and trimethylborane (B(CH3)3) or diborane (B2H6) for p-type. Due to its defective nature, doped amorphous silicon (as opposed to intrinsic) cannot provide passivation to crystalline silicon; similarly epitaxial growth of any such a-Si layer causes severe detriment to passivation quality and cell efficiency and must be prevented during deposition.

Anti-reflection coating 
The dual purpose antireflection coating (ARC), usually composed of Indium tin oxide (ITO), is then sputtered onto both sides to the thickness required for optimum light capture at the peak of the solar spectrum (around 550 nm ). The optimum thickness for a single-layer ARC is given by;

Depending on the refractive index of the ITO (typically ~0.9), the optimum layer thickness is usually 70-80 nm. Due to thin-film interference, the ITO (a dull grey-black ceramic material) appears a vibrant blue colour at this thickness.

Indium tin oxide is a transparent conducting oxide (TCO) which enhances lateral conductivity of the contact surfaces without significantly impeding light transmission. This is necessary because the amorphous layers have a relatively high resistance despite their high doping levels. Due to the scarcity of indium, alternative TCOs such as aluminium-doped zinc oxide (AZO) are being researched for use in SHJ cells. AZO has a much higher chemical sensitivity than ITO, which presents challenges for certain metallisation methods that require etching, such as nickel seed layer etch-backs and typically has a poorer interface contact to both p- and n-type amorphous layers.

Through evaporation, a double-antireflection coating of magnesium fluoride (MgF2) or aluminium oxide (Al2O3) may be used to further reduce surface reflections, however this step is not currently employed in industrial production.

Role of work function 
The TCO layer for SHJ cells should ideally have a high work function (ie. the energy difference between the Fermi level and the Vacuum level) to prevent formation of a parasitic Schottky barrier at the interface between the TCO and the p-type amorphous layer. This can be partially alleviated by increasing the doping of the p-type layer, which decreases the barrier width and improves open-circuit voltage and fill factor. However increased doping increases junction recombination, diminishing  gains. Depositing a higher work function TCO such as tungsten oxide (WOx) or tuning the deposition parameters of ITO can also reduce the barrier height; typically the latter is used due to the preferable optical properties of ITO.

Metallisation

Printed paste 

Heterojunction solar cells are typically metallised (ie. fabrication of the metal contacts) in two distinct methods. Screen-printing of silver paste is common in industry as is with traditional solar cells, with a market share of over 98%. However low-temperature silver paste is required for SHJ cells. These suffer major drawbacks including low grid conductivity and high silver consumption, volatile production costs or poor adhesion to the front surface. Despite their significantly higher cost, the resistivity of low-temperature silver pastes has been estimated to be 4–6 times higher than standard silver paste. To compensate for lowered conductivity, low-temperature silver pastes also consume more silver than conventional silver pastes, however silver consumption is trending downward as the development of screen-printing technology reduces finger linewidths. Improvements in the composition of low-temperature pastes are expected to further reduce silver consumption, such as through screen-printable silver-coated copper paste. Such pastes perform comparably to conventional low-temperature pastes, with up to 30% reduction in silver consumption. Silver-coated copper pastes are becoming an increasingly dominant metallisation technology amongst Chinese SHJ manufacturers into 2030, with 50% market share expected from 2024–2025.

Printed ink 
Silver nanoparticle ink can be deposited onto a SHJ solar cell using inkjet printing, or through contact deposition with a hollow glass capillary. Inkjet deposition has been reported to reduce silver consumption from 200 mg per cell to less than 10 mg per cell compared with traditional silver paste screen printing. Further reductions are possible with capillary deposition (known as "FlexTrail" as the capillary is flexible and trails across the wafer surface) leading to as little as 3 mg of silver deposited. Such a large reduction in silver has implications for the grid design to compensate for lower conduction, namely using a busbar-less design.

Electroplated 
An alternative to printed electrodes uses electroplated copper. The conductivity of electroplated copper is similar to that of bulk copper. This has potential to increase the SHJ cell current density through decreasing grid resistance. Improved feature geometry can also be achieved. However industrial production is challenging as electroplating requires selective patterning using a sacrificial inkjet-printed or photolithographically-derived mask. As a result, electroplated SHJ cells are not currently manufactured commercially. Copper plated directly to the ITO also suffers from adhesion issues. Therefore it is usually necessary to first deposit a thin (~1μm) seed layer of nickel through sputtering or electrodeposition.

Interconnection 
SHJ temperature sensitivity has further implications for cell interconnection when manufacturing SHJ-based solar panels. High temperatures involved in soldering must be carefully controlled to avoid degradation of the cell passivation. Low temperature pastes have also suffered from weak adhesion to interconnecting wires or ribbons, which have consequences for module durability. Optimisation of these pastes and infrared soldering parameters, as well as careful selection of solder alloys, has led to increased success of interconnection processes on standard industrial equipment.

Multi-junction 
Heterojunction–Perovskite tandem structures have been fabricated, with some research groups reporting a power conversion efficiency exceeding the 29.43% Shockley–Queisser limit for crystalline silicon. This feat has been achieved in both monolithic and 4-terminal cell configurations. In such devices, in order to reduce thermalisation losses, the wide bandgap Perovskite top cell absorbs high energy photons whilst the SHJ bottom cell absorbs lower energy photons. In a bifacial configuration, the bottom cell can also accept light from the rear surface.

In 2017, tandem solar cells using a SHJ bottom cell and Group III–V semiconductor top cells were fabricated with power conversion efficiencies of 32.8% and 35.9% for 2- and 3-junction non-monolithic stacks respectively.

Alternative heterojunction materials 
Aside from the typical c-Si/a-Si:H structure, various groups have successfully produced passivated contact silicon heterojunction solar cells using novel semiconducting materials, such as between c-Si/SiOx, c-Si/MoOx and c-Si/poly-Si or c-Si/SiOx/poly-Si (POLO; polycrystalline silicon on oxide). Hybrid inorganic–organic heterojunction solar cells have been produced using n-type silicon coated with polyaniline emeraldine base. Heterojunction solar cells have also been produced on multicrystalline silicon absorber substrates.

Interdigitated Back Contact 
Heterojunction solar cells are compatible with IBC technology, ie. the cell metallisation is entirely on the back surface. A Heterojunction IBC cell is often abbreviated to HBC. A HBC structure has several advantages over conventional SHJ cells; the major advantage is the elimination of shading from the front grid, which improves light capture and hence short circuit current density . Conventional SHJ cells often suffer from poor  compared to PERC, as some light is parasitically absorbed in the amorphous silicon layers, as well as the metal front contact. As such, HBC cells have potential for high efficiencies; notably a long-standing world record heterojunction cell employed a HBC structure, at 26.7% fabricated by Kaneka.

HBC cells are fabricated by localised doping of the rear side, in an alternating pattern of p- and n-type areas in an interdigitated pattern. The front side does not require a specific doping profile.

Defect kinetics 

Defects are sites at which charge carriers can inadvertently become "trapped", making them more likely to recombine through the Shockley-Read-Hall method (SRH Recombination). They are most likely to exist at interfaces (surface recombination), at crystal grain boundaries and dislocations, or at impurities. To prevent losses in efficiency, defects must be passivated (ie. become chemically and electrically neutral). Generally this occurs through bonding of the defect interface with interstitial hydrogen.

Understanding the behaviour of defects, and how they interact with hydrogen over time and in manufacturing processes, is crucial for maintaining the stability and performance of SHJ solar cells.

Light-induced Degradation 
The behaviour of light-sensitive defect passivation in amorphous silicon networks has been a topic of study since the discovery of the Staebler–Wronski effect in 1977. Staebler and Wronski found a gradual decrease in photoconductivity and dark conductivity of amorphous silicon thin films upon exposure to light for several hours. This effect is reversible upon dark annealing at temperatures above 150 °C and is a common example of reversible Light-induced Degradation (LID) in hydrogenated amorphous silicon devices. The introduction of new band gap states, causing a decrease in the carrier lifetime, was proposed to be the mechanism behind the degradation. Subsequent studies have explored the role of hydrogen migration and metastable hydrogen-trapping defects in the Staebler–Wronski effect.
	
Amongst many variables, the kinetics and extent of the Staebler–Wronski effect is dependent on crystallite grain size in the thin film and the light soaking illuminance.
	
Some amorphous silicon devices can also observe the opposite effect through LID, such as the increase in  observed in amorphous silicon solar cells and notably SHJ solar cells upon light soaking. Kobayashi, et al. (2016) proposes that this is due to the shifting of the Fermi level of the intrinsic buffer layer closer to the band edges when in contact with the doped amorphous silicon selective contacts, noting that a similar reversal of the Staebler–Wronski effect was observed by Scuto et al. (2015) when hydrogenated a-Si photovoltaic devices were light-soaked under reverse bias.

Deliberate annealing of heterojunction cells in an industrial post-processing step can improve lifetimes and decrease surface recombination velocity. It has been suggested that thermal annealing causes interstitial hydrogen to diffuse closer to the heterointerface, allowing greater saturation of dangling bond defects. Such a process may be enhanced using illumination during annealing, however this can cause degradation before the improvement in carrier lifetimes is achieved, and thus requires careful optimisation in a commercial setting. Illuminated annealing at high temperatures is instrumental in the Advanced Hydrogenation Process (AHP), an inline technique for defect mitigation developed by UNSW.

The Boron–Oxygen complex LID defect is a pervasive problem with the efficiency and stability of cheap p-type wafers and a major reason that n-type is preferred for SHJ substrates. Stabilising wafers against B–O LID using the Advanced Hydrogenation Process has had variable success and reliability issues. Therefore gallium has been proposed as an economically feasible alternative p-type dopant for use in SHJ absorbers. Gallium doped cells have potential for higher stability and lower defect density than boron, with research groups achieving  exceeding 730 mV on gallium-doped p-type SHJ.

References 

Solar cells